Sebastián Alberto Torrico (born 22 February 1980 in Luján de Cuyo, Mendoza) is an Argentine former footballer who last played as a goalkeeper for San Lorenzo.

Honours
Godoy Cruz
Primera B Nacional: 2005 Apertura
Primera B Nacional: Season 2005/06

San Lorenzo
Argentine Primera División: 2013 Inicial
Copa Libertadores: 2014
Supercopa Argentina: 2015

References

 Argentine Primera statistics

External links

1980 births
Living people
Sportspeople from Mendoza Province
Argentine footballers
Association football goalkeepers
Godoy Cruz Antonio Tomba footballers
Argentinos Juniors footballers
San Lorenzo de Almagro footballers
Argentine Primera División players
Primera Nacional players